"Something to Write Home About" is a debut song co-written and recorded by American country music artist Craig Morgan.  It was released in February 2000 as the first single from the album Craig Morgan.  The song reached #38 on the Billboard Hot Country Singles & Tracks chart.  The song was written by Morgan and Tony Ramey.

Chart performance

References

2000 debut singles
Songs written by Craig Morgan
Song recordings produced by Buddy Cannon
Song recordings produced by Norro Wilson
Atlantic Records singles
2000 songs
Craig Morgan songs
Songs written by Tony Ramey